Dolores Martí de Cid (born September 6, 1916) was an expert on Latin American theater and literature.

Biography
Dolores Martí de Cid was born in Madrid, Spain, on September 6, 1916. As the daughter of a Cuban diplomat, she studied in many countries and became fluent in several languages. Dolores received her doctorate in "Filosofía y Letras" in 1943, from the University of Havana.

Dolores married José Cid Pérez, a prominent Cuban playwright, in 1939 and worked with him for the rest of her life on their studies of Latin American theater. Dolores and José left Cuba in 1960, due to Fidel Castro's Communist revolution, and came to the United States, where she became an American citizen in 1970. Dolores began teaching at the University of Kansas and then was a professor at Purdue University. After they left Cuba, Castro burned their 25,000-volume personal library, which included some priceless and irreplaceable material and which was said to be "the best library in the world on Latin American theater." Fortunately, their files accumulated over twenty-five years on Latin American Indian theater were saved through the friendship of a foreign diplomat in Havana.

She lectured in several countries, wrote many articles and books on Latin American theater, as well as textbooks, and received many awards and honors as a result. One of her published books is Tres Mujeres de América. Teatro Indio Precolombino and Poesías Completas de Gertrudis Gómez de Avellaneda were also published by Dolores with José Cid as co-author. Dolores Martí de Cid, who devoted her life to the study of Latin American literature and culture, died in New York City, in May 1993.

Works or publications

Notes and references

Further reading

External links

 The Dolores Martí de Cid collection is available at the Cuban Heritage Collection, University of Miami Libraries. The Dolores Martí de Cid collection contains numerous works on Latin American theater and literature.

1916 births
1993 deaths
Cuban expatriates in Spain
Cuban emigrants to the United States
University of Kansas faculty
Purdue University faculty
Cuban educators
Women educators